State Highway 5 (West Bengal) is a state highway in West Bengal, India.

Route
SH 5 originates from Rupnarayanpur and passes through Salanpur, Neamatpur, Dishergarh, Par Beliya, Raghunathpur, Bongabari, Purulia, Kenda, Manbazar, Bandwan, Jhilimili, Belpahari, Silda, Binpur, Dahijuri, Jhargram, Lodhasuli, Kharagpur, Salua, Keshiary, Belda, Dhaneswarpur, Egra, Contai and terminates at Junput.

National Highway Authority of India or NHAI has proposed a new highway that will connect Jhargram with Dankuni via Jhilimili, Mukutmanipur, Simlapal, Taldangra, Bishnupur, Jaypur, Kotulpur, Arambag, Champadanga & Chanditala.

The total length of SH 5 is 376 km.

Districts traversed by SH 5 are:
Paschim Bardhaman district (0 - 22 km)Purulia district (22 – 183 km)Bankura district (183 – 186 km)Paschim Medinipur district (186 – 333 km)Purba Medinipur district (333 – 376 km)

Road sections
It is divided into different sections as follows:

External links

See also
List of state highways in West Bengal

References

State Highways in West Bengal